Genro may refer to:

 Genro (surname)
 Genrō (元老), Japanese title